Henry IV the Pious, Duke of Saxony (16 March 1473, in Dresden – 18 August 1541, in Dresden) was a Duke of Saxony from the House of Wettin. Succeeding his brother George, Duke of Saxony, a fervent Catholic who sought to extinguish Lutheranism by any means possible, Henry established the Lutheran church as the state religion in his domains.

Biography
Henry was the second son of Albert, Duke of Saxony, and his wife Sidonie Podiebrad, princess of Bohemia. When Albert died in 1500, his eldest son George succeeded to the Duchy of Saxony, and Henry became Lord of Friesland.

Saxon rule of Friesland was disturbed by constant revolts. Consequently, Henry, who was of a rather inert disposition, gave up his title there. In 1505 Henry ceded Friesland to George, in return for an annuity and the districts of Wolkenstein and Freiberg, where Henry made his residence.

In 1517, Martin Luther posted the Ninety-five Theses which sparked the Reformation in Germany, and a few years later Henry adopted the Evangelical faith. George remained a devout Catholic. Only two of George's sons survived to adulthood, John and Frederick, but they both predeceased him without issue. When Frederick died in 1539, the Lutheran Henry became heir presumptive to the Duchy under the Act of Settlement of 1499. To prevent a Protestant succession, George tried to override his father's will, disinherit Henry, and bequeath the Duchy to Ferdinand, brother of Charles V. However, George died only two months later, and Henry succeeded to the Duchy aged 66. He made Lutheranism the state religion of the Duchy of Saxony but reigned for only two years.

Marriage and  children
In Freiberg, on 6 July 1512, Heinrich married Catherine of Mecklenburg, daughter of Duke Magnus II of Mecklenburg-Schwerin. They had six children:

Sybille (b. Freiberg, 2 May 1515 – d. Buxtehude, 18 July 1592), married on 8 February 1540 to Duke Francis I of Saxe-Lauenburg.
Emilie (b. Freiberg, 27 July 1516 – d. Ansbach, 9 March 1591), married on 25 August 1533 to Georg, Margrave of Brandenburg-Ansbach.
Sidonie (b. Meissen, 8 March 1518 – d. Kloster Weissenfels, 4 January 1575), married on 17 May 1545 to Eric II, Duke of Brunswick-Lüneburg (Calenberg).
Maurice (b. Freiberg, 21 March 1521 – d. of wounds received in action at Sievershausen, 11 July 1553), later Elector of Saxony.
Severinus (b. Freiberg?, 28 August 1522 – d. Innsbruck, 10 October 1533).
Augustus (b. Freiberg, 31 July 1526 – d. Dresden, 11 February 1586).

References

Sources

External links
  Article in the ABD

1473 births
1541 deaths
Converts to Lutheranism from Roman Catholicism
Dukes of Saxony
House of Wettin
Nobility from Dresden
People from Freiberg
Potestaats of Friesland
Saxon princes
Albertine branch
Burials at Freiberg Cathedral